This article is a list of episodes of the anime Heroic Age, which first aired on April 1, 2007. It is currently airing on Japanese networks such as TV Tokyo and TV Osaka.

The story focuses on a boy called Age, who has a powerful alternate form called Bellcross. Age happens to be a Nodos, which is a being entrusted with an essence of the Hero Tribe, a once powerful race. After Princess Dhianeila of the Iron Tribe, or mankind, visits his planet to ask for his help in defeating the Silver Tribe, who threatens the Iron Tribe's existence, he begins to fulfill the contract assigned to him by his "fathers", the great Golden Tribe.



Episodes

References

Heroic Age